Södermanland Regiment, designation I 10, was a Swedish Army infantry regiment that operated 1634–1942 and 1957–1963. The unit was based in the Strängnäs Garrison in Strängnäs, Södermanland, Sweden. In 1963 the regiment was transferred to the Swedish Armoured Troops under the name of Södermanland Regiment (P 10).

History
In October 1939, in accordance with the Defence act of 1936, I 10 had been reorganized into a combined regiment, ie with an infantry battalion and an armored battalion. The tanks of the armored battalion came from the then disbanded Göta Life Guard (I 2) and consisted of Stridsvagn m/21-29, Stridsvagn m/31, Stridsvagn m/37 and Stridsvagn m/38, in all about 40. Due to the military-political situation of 1940, in April, for the first time in Sweden, a tank battalion was mobilized, namely the 1st Tank Battalion (1. stridsvagnsbataljonen) at I 10 in Strängnäs. Through the Defence Act of 1942, the regiment was reorganized into the Södermanland Armored Regiment (P 3) in 1942, and transferred to the newly formed Swedish Armoured Troops.

With the formation of the Armoured Troops in 1942, the organization of armored brigades was started in Sweden and on 1 July 1943, Sweden's first armored brigade, the 10th Armored Brigade (10. pansarbrigaden, PB 10) was mainly organized by the regiment. The brigade's personnel strength was 6,400 men and it was equipped with 181 tanks (mainly Stridsvagn m/41 and Stridsvagn m/42). When Uppland Regiment (I 8) was disbanded in 1957 and the command there transferred to Strängnäs (the so-called Mälarkarusellen), the regiment regained its old designation I 10. The regiment now together with Göta Life Guards (P 1) was responsible for training two armored brigades PB 6 and PB 10 and I 10 in that case for the armored infantry sections and P 1 for the tank section. PB 10 was gradually equipped during this period with Stridsvagn 74. In 1963 the regiment was returned to the armored forces under the name Södermanland Regiment (P 10).

Units
In connection with the Defence Act of 1942 when the infantry regiments raised field regiments, Södermanland Regiment instead came to organize an armored brigade. The Defence Act of 1948 introduced brigades throughout the army, which resulted in the army being streamlined into two brigade types, infantry brigades and armored brigades, where Södermanland Regiment accounted for Södermanland Brigade (PB 10).

Södermanland Brigade
Södermanland Brigade (PB 10) was formed in 1949 by reorganizing the 10th Armored Brigade (10. pansarbrigaden) into an Armored Brigade Type 49 (Pansarbrigad 49). The brigade was at the same time given the name Södermanland Brigade (PB 10). By the Defence Act of 1958, the brigade was reorganized into armored infantry and was then named IB 10. In 1963, the brigade together with the regiment became part of the Swedish Armoured Troops.

Army Vehicle School
Swedish Army Vehicle School (Arméns motorskola, MotorS) was formed in 1944 as an independent functional school. The school was initially located in Stockholm. In 1948 the school was relocated to Strängnäs. On 28 May 1970, the school was separated from the Södermanland Regiment, and formed an independent unit and authority. From 1 July 1986, the school was amalgamated again into Södermanland Regiment (P 10). In the summer of 1991, the school was relocated to Skövde, where, from 1 July 1991, it was amalgamated into the newly formed Swedish Army Maintenance Center (Arméns underhållscentrum, UhC).

Companies
Companies 1-4 formed the first battalion, and companies 5-8 formed the second battalion.

1690
Life Company (Colonel's Company)
Vingåker Company (Major's Company)
Nyköping Company
Oppunda Company
Strängnäs Company (Lieutenant Colonel's Company)
Öster Rekarne Company
Väster Rekarne Company
Gripsholm Company

1850
Life Company
Vingåker Company
Nyköping Company
Oppunda Company
Strängnäs Company
Öster Rekarne Company
Väster Rekarne Company
Gripsholm Company

Locations and training areas

Locations
The regiment's barracks area was built in the years 1916-1921, and the moving in took place on 3 July 1921, but was completely completed in the summer of 1923. The barracks area has been expanded over the years, for example with a new vehicle area in the late 1970s. In connection with Svea Engineer Regiment being planned to be relocated to Strängnäs, both chancellery and barracks were completed for the engineer unit.

Training areas
The regiment trained from 1774 on Malma heath (Malma hed) at Malmköping and was moved in 1921 to barracks in Strängnäs.

Heraldry and traditions

Coat of arms
Blazon: "Or, the provincial badge of Södermanland, a griffin segreant sable, armed and langued gules. The shield surmounted two swords in saltire or."

Colours, standards and guidons
The regiment presented a number of colour through the years. The regiment's last colour as infantry regiment was presented on 23 June1850 by His Majesty the King Oscar I. The colour originally bore the battle honours Fraustadt and Södra Stäket. In 1910, the griffin was transferred to a new cloth, and in conjunction with that restoration, the colour was given additional battle honours. On 7 June 1958, His Majesty the King Gustaf VI Adolf's presented a new colour. The colour was then used until 1994 when the successor to the infantry regiment received a new colour, which was presented by His Majesty the King Carl XVI Gustaf.

Commanding officers
Regimental commanders 1677–1942 and 1957–1963.

1627–16??: Erik Eriksson Rynning
1677–1683: Peter Örneklou
1683–1687: Evert Horn af Marienborg  
1688–1697: Wolter Reinhold Wrangel till Ellistfer
1697–1708: A A Marderfelt 
1708–1709: G von Weidenhaijn 
1710–1711: Jacob Grundel
1711–1716: C R von Schlippenbach 
1716–1739: Rutger Fuchs
1739–1750: H J von Essen
1750–1763: G W Marcks von Würtemberg
1763–1771: J Cronstedt
1771–1792: Gustaf Adolf von Siegroth
1792–1813: Gustaf Wachtmeister
1813–1821: Lennart Reuterskiöld
1821–1824: C U Ridderstolpe
1824–1827: C F Posse
1827–1837: M A Lewenhaupt
1837–1856: C U Kuylenstierna
1856–1859: P W von Schwerin
1859–1864: S A Sandels
1864–1870: Henrik Rosensvärd
1870–1879: C J G af Schmidt
1879–1881: O E F Fleming
1881–1887: Axel Leijonhufvud
1890–1896: Henning Thulstrup
1896–1904: S E W Brehmer
1904–1906: A O F von Arbin
1906–1910: Salomon Vilhelm Sundelius
1910–1921: Seth Zetterstrand
1921–1926: Gabriel Hedengren
1926–1928: Herman Låftman
1929–1935: Erik af Edholm
1935–1942: Gustaf Berggren
1942–1957: See Södermanland Regiment (armoured)
1957–1963: Fritz-Ivar Virgin

Names, designations and locations

See also
Södermanland Regiment (armoured)
List of Swedish infantry regiments

Footnotes

References

Notes

Print

Further reading

Infantry regiments of the Swedish Army
Military units and formations established in 1634
Military units and formations disestablished in 1709
Military units and formations established in 1710
Military units and formations disestablished in 1713
Military units and formations established in 1714
Military units and formations disestablished in 1942
Military units and formations established in 1957
Military units and formations disestablished in 1963
Disbanded units and formations of Sweden
1634 establishments in Sweden
1709 disestablishments in Sweden
1710 establishments in Sweden
1713 disestablishments in Sweden
1714 establishments in Sweden
1942 disestablishments in Sweden
1957 establishments in Sweden
1963 disestablishments in Sweden
Strängnäs Garrison